Rockwell Blake (born January 10, 1951) is an American operatic tenor, particularly known for his roles in Rossini operas. He was the first winner of the Richard Tucker Award.

Biography
Born and raised in Plattsburgh, NY, Blake was the son of a mink farmer. After graduating from high school in Peru, he studied music first at the State University of New York at Fredonia and then at The Catholic University of America. On leaving Catholic University, he served for three years in the United States Navy as a member of the Sea Chanters male chorus and later as a soloist with the US Navy Band. During that time, he continued his voice training with Renata Carisio Booth, who had been his teacher since his school days.

He made his solo opera debut in 1976 at the Kennedy Center in Washington D.C. as Lindoro in Rossini's L'italiana in Algeri, and made his debut at the New York Metropolitan Opera House in 1981 in the same role, with Marilyn Horne as his Isabella. He went on to become one of the leading Rossini singers of his generation, singing regularly at the Rossini Opera Festival in Pesaro since his debut there in 1983. He made his only stage appearance at La Scala in 1992 as Giacomo in La donna del lago. It was La Scala's first production of the opera in 150 years and was staged to mark the bicentenary of Rossini's birth.

Although several critics have expressed reservations about the intrinsic slightly harsh timbre of his voice, his two-and-a-half octave range and mastery of florid vocal technique and coloratura have made him a successful interpreter not only of Rossini's tenore contraltino roles (in whose recent revival he has been a chief protagonist), but also of operas by Mozart, Donizetti, Bellini and Handel. Within that repertoire, Blake has sung in over 40 operas, including relative rarities such as Rossini's Zelmira, Mozart's' Zaide, Donizetti's Il furioso all'isola di San Domingo, Haydn's L'infedelta delusa and Boieldieu's La Dame blanche. Blake has also been active in the orchestral and oratorio tenor repertoire, performing in works by Bach, Beethoven, Berlioz, Britten, Handel, Haydn, Mendelssohn, Mozart, Rossini, Saint-Saëns, and Stravinsky.

Since 2001 he has increasingly devoted himself to teaching and has given master classes at the Associazione Lirica Concertistica Italiana in Milan, the Conservatoire Nationale de Paris, the Accademia Nazionale di Santa Cecilia in Rome, Duke University in North Carolina, the State University of New York at Plattsburgh, the Hamburg Staatsoper, and the Chicago Lyric Opera young artists program.

His last appearances on the opera stage were as Uberto in Rossini's La donna del lago (Lisbon, 2005) and as Libenskoff in Rossini's Il viaggio a Reims (Montecarlo, 2005).

Prizes and distinctions 
 Richard Tucker Award, 1978
Omicron Delta Kappa, 1988, SUNY Plattsburgh
 Cavaliere Ufficiale, Ordine al Merito della Repubblica Italiana, 1994
 Diapason d'Or de l'Année, 1994
 Honorary Degree – Doctor of Music, State University of New York at Plattsburgh, 1988
 Victoire de la Musique, 1997
 Chevalier de l'Ordre des Arts et des Lettres de la République française, 2000
 Grand Prix du Palmarès des Palmarès, 2004

Discography 
Operas
 Boieldieu – La Dame blanche, Conductor: Marc Minkowski (CD Angel/EMI)
 Donizetti – Alina, Regina di Golconda: Conductor Antonello Allemandi (CD Nuova Era)
 Donizetti – Marino Faliero, Conductor: Ottavio Dantone (DVD Hardy Classic)
 Mozart – Mitridate Re di Ponto, Conductor: Theodor Guschlbauer (DVD Euro Arts)
 Rossini – Il barbiere di Siviglia, Conductor: Bruno Campanella (CD Nuova Era)
 Rossini - Il barbiere di Siviglia, Conductor: Ralf Weikert (DVD Deutsche Grammophon)
 Rossini – La Donna del Lago, Conductor: Riccardo Muti (CD Philips)
 Rossini – La Donna del Lago, Conductor: Riccardo Muti (DVD La Scala Collection)
 Rossini – La Donna del Lago, Conductor: Claudio Scimone (CD Ponto)
 Rossini – Elisabetta Regina d'Inghilterra, Conductor Gabriele Ferro (DVD Hardy Classic)
 Meyerbeer – Robert le Diable, Conductor Thomas Fulton (DVD Encore)

Recitals
 Airs d'Opéras Français (CD EMI)
 The Rossini Tenor (CD Arabesque Records)
 Encore Rossini (CD Arabesque Records)
 The Mozart Tenor (CD Arabesque Records)
 Rossini Melodies (CD EMI)
 Participation in The Rossini Bicentennial Birthday Gala (VHS/Laserdisc and CD EMI)

References
Notes

Sources
Duffie, B., January 13, 1991 and January 14, 1996, Interviews with Rockwell Blake, WNIB Radio. Accessed 31 July 2008.
Rockwell Blake Performance Record, New York Metropolitan Opera Data Base. Accessed 31 July 2008.
Holland, B., 'Apollo and Thamos, A Pair of Mozart Rarities', The New York Times, August 13, 1989. Accessed 31 July 2008.
Horwitz, S., 1991, 'Rockwell Blake', Opera Monthly.
IMG Artists, Rockwell Blake Biography. Accessed 25 April 2007.
Kozinn, A., 'A Headstrong Tenor Discusses Music and Critics', The New York Times, August 6, 1989. Accessed 31 July 2008.
Kretschmer, J., 'Top of the Ranks', Opera News, February 1992.
Law, J., 'La donna del lago (1819)', Opera Quarterly, 1993; 9: 228–232.
Thea Dispeker Artists Management, 2002, Rockwell Blake Biography. Accessed 31 July 2008.
The New Grove Dictionary of Opera, Oxford University Press.
The Richard Tucker Music Foundation. (accessed 25 April 2007)

1951 births
American operatic tenors
People from Plattsburgh, New York
Richard Tucker Award winners
State University of New York at Fredonia alumni
Catholic University of America alumni
Living people
20th-century American male opera singers
21st-century American male opera singers
State University of New York at Plattsburgh faculty